Polo is an Italian and Spanish surname, the most well known bearing the name being Italian trader and explorer Marco Polo (1254–1324). Other notable people with the surname include:

 Niccolò and Maffeo Polo (1230–1294 and 1230–1309 respectively), Marco Polo's father and uncle respectively
 Aldo Polo (born 1983), Mexican footballer
 Ana María Polo (born 1959), Cuban-American lawyer and Hispanic television arbitrator
 Andy Polo (born 1994), Peruvian footballer
 Armando Polo (born 1990), Panamanian footballer
 Asier Polo, Spanish cellist
 Bernardo Polo (died c. 1700), Spanish painter
 Carmen Polo (1900–1988), wife of Francisco Franco and a member of the Spanish nobility
 Danny Polo (1901–1949), American jazz clarinetist
 Dean Polo (born 1986), Australian rules footballer
 Diego Polo the Elder (1560–1600), Spanish Renaissance painter
 Diego Polo the Younger (1620–1655) Spanish Baroque painter, nephew of the above
 Eddie Polo (1875–1961), Austro-American actor of the silent era born Edward W. Wyman or Weimer
 Edward Polo (born 1989), Nigerian footballer
 Enrico Polo (1868–1953), Italian violinist, composer and pedagogue
 Gaspar Gil Polo (1530?–1591), Spanish novelist and poet
 Joe Polo (born 1982), American curler
 Leonardo Polo (1926–2013), Spanish philosopher
 Malvina Polo (1903–2000), American actress, daughter of Eddie Polo
 Roberto Polo (born 1980), Colombian footballer
 Saul Polo, Canadian politician
 Teri Polo (born 1969), American actress
 Tom Polo (born 1965), Australian artist

See also
 Alejandro Zaera-Polo (born 1963), Spanish architect and dean of the School of Architecture at Princeton University

Italian-language surnames
Spanish-language surnames